Arielle Kayabaga is a Canadian politician, who was elected to the Canadian House of Commons in the 2021 Canadian federal election. She represents the electoral district of London West as a member of the Liberal Party of Canada.

Biography 
Born in Bujumbura, Burundi, Kayabaga's family moved to Canada when she was 11 as refugees from the Burundian Civil War, living in Montreal for a year before moving to London, Ontario. She earned a bachelor's degree in political science from Carleton University in Ottawa in 2013. Before her election to the London City Council, Kayabaga worked as a settlement worker for newcomers to London and nearby Sarnia, Ontario.

In 2018, she was elected to the London City Council at age 27, becoming the first black woman to do so in the city's history. As a city councillor, she chaired the Corporate Services Committee and sat on the Standing Committee on Municipal Finance. In September 2020, London police launched an investigation after she reported her office receiving harassing phone calls.

Ahead of the 2021 Canadian federal election, she announced her intention to run for the federal House of Commons, winning the Liberal Party of Canada nomination for the riding of London West three days before the start of the electoral campaign. She successfully won the seat with 36,8% of the vote, replacing outgoing Liberal MP Kate Young. She is the first Franco-Ontarian to serve as MP for London West.

Electoral record

References

External links

Living people
Members of the House of Commons of Canada from Ontario
Liberal Party of Canada MPs
Burundian emigrants to Canada
London, Ontario city councillors
Black Canadian politicians
Black Canadian women
Franco-Ontarian people
People from Bujumbura
Women members of the House of Commons of Canada
Carleton University alumni
21st-century Canadian politicians
21st-century Canadian women politicians
Year of birth missing (living people)